Aplysiopsis formosa is a species of sacoglossan sea slug, a shell-less marine opisthobranch gastropod mollusk in the family Hermaeidae.

References

Hermaeidae
Gastropods described in 1953
Taxa named by Alice Pruvot-Fol